Psilocybe pintonii is a species of mushroom in the family Hymenogastraceae. It is in the section Zapotecorum of the genus Psilocybe, other members of this section include Psilocybe muliercula, Psilocybe angustipleurocystidiata, Psilocybe aucklandii, Psilocybe collybioides, Psilocybe kumaenorum, Psilocybe zapotecorum, Psilocybe kumaenorum, Psilocybe subcaerulipes, Psilocybe moseri, Psilocybe zapotecoantillarum, Psilocybe zapotecocaribaea, and Psilocybe antioquiensis.

See also
List of Psilocybin mushrooms
Psilocybin mushrooms
Psilocybe

References

Entheogens
Psychoactive fungi
pintonii
Psychedelic tryptamine carriers
Fungi of North America